Piney Township is an inactive township in Oregon County, in the U.S. state of Missouri.

Piney Township takes its name from Piney Creek.

References

Townships in Missouri
Townships in Oregon County, Missouri